Sproat Street/Adelaide Street is a QLINE streetcar station in Detroit, Michigan. The station opened for service on May 12, 2017, and is located near the southern end of Midtown Detroit. The station services the Brush Park and lower Cass Corridor neighborhoods. The station is adjacent to Little Caesars Arena, the home of the National Hockey League's Detroit Red Wings and National Basketball Association's Detroit Pistons. During the planning stage the station was known as Sibley.

Destinations
 Little Caesars Arena (the home of the NHL's Red Wings and NBA's Pistons)

Station
The station, in addition to Montcalm Street station neighboring it to the south, are sponsored by Ilitch Holdings. It is heated and features security cameras and emergency phones. Passenger amenities include Wi-Fi and arrival signs.

See also

Streetcars in North America

References

Tram stops of QLine
Railway stations in the United States opened in 2017